In philosophy, the Rietdijk–Putnam argument, named after  and Hilary Putnam, uses 20th-century findings in physicsspecifically in special relativityto support the philosophical position known as four-dimensionalism.

If special relativity is true, then each observer will have their own plane of simultaneity, which contains a unique set of events that constitutes the observer's present moment. Observers moving at different relative velocities have different planes of simultaneity, and hence different sets of events that are present. Each observer considers their set of present events to be a three-dimensional universe, but even the slightest movement of the head or offset in distance between observers can cause the three-dimensional universes to have differing content. If each three-dimensional universe exists, then the existence of multiple three-dimensional universes suggests that the universe is four-dimensional. The argument is named after the discussions by Rietdijk (1966) and Putnam (1967). It is sometimes called the Rietdijk–Putnam–Penrose argument.

Andromeda paradox

Roger Penrose advanced a form of this argument that has been called the Andromeda paradox in which he points out that two people walking past each other in the street could have very different present moments. If one of the people were walking towards the Andromeda Galaxy, then events in this galaxy might be hours or even days advanced of the events on Andromeda for the person walking in the other direction. If this occurs, it would have dramatic effects on our understanding of time. Penrose highlighted the consequences by discussing a potential invasion of Earth by aliens living in the Andromeda Galaxy. As Penrose put it:

The "paradox" consists of two observers who are, from their conscious perspective, in the same place and at the same instant having different sets of events in their "present moment". Notice that neither observer can actually "see" what is happening in Andromeda, because light from Andromeda (and the hypothetical alien fleet) will take 2.5 million years to reach Earth. The argument is not about what can be "seen"; it is purely about what events different observers consider to occur in the present moment.

Criticisms  

It should be understood that the Andromeda Paradox is emphasising a part of mainstream physics.  According to the relativity of simultaneity observers who are moving relative to each other will have different ideas about which events are present.  Two observers moving at a relative velocity of "v" see that their present moments differ by vx/c2 seconds where x is the distance to an event in the direction of motion.  The example of the Andromeda Paradox emphasises that there is no universal present moment in modern physics.

The Rietdijk–Putnam argument and the Andromeda paradox have drawn attention to the philosophy of simultaneity and are subject to caveats. Howard Stein and Steven F. Savitt note that in relativity the present is a local concept that cannot be extended to global hyperplanes (ie: that the example of two different galaxies might be doubtful). Furthermore, N. David Mermin states:

So stressing that the "present moment" cannot be applied to very distant events with any accuracy.

References

Further reading
 Vesselin Petkov (2005) "Is There an Alternative to the Block Universe View?" in Dennis Dieks (ed.), The Ontology of Spacetime, Elsevier, Amsterdam, 2006; "Philosophy and Foundations of Physics" Series, pp. 207–228
 Wikibook:The relativity of simultaneity and the Andromeda paradox
 "Being and Becoming in Modern Physics", Stanford Encyclopedia of Philosophy

Physical paradoxes
Special relativity